Red is the debut studio album by American singer-songwriter Dia Frampton, released on December 6, 2011, by Universal Republic Records.

Background
Dia Frampton was a member of American rock band Meg & Dia along with her sister Meg and additional members Nicholas Price, Jonathan Snyder and Carlo Gimenez. After appearing on the first season of the American reality talent show The Voice, as a contestant (and eventual runner-up) in early 2011, Frampton began her career as a solo recording artist.

Critical reception

The album received positive reviews from music critics who highlighted the production, features and lyrics. Allmusic gave it a 3 out of 5 rating, stating, "Dia Frampton's 2011 major-label debut, Red, is a sweet, melodic, and pop-oriented affair that builds upon her second-place finish in the 2011 season of NBC's The Voice". They also give praise to tracks "Don't Kick the Chair" (featuring Kid Cudi) and "Isabella", saying they "have an alternative singer/songwriter meets electronic pop vibe that fits nicely along with such similarly inclined artists as Ellie Goulding, Lights, and Alex Winston". They also complimented the country power ballad duet with Frampton's The Voice coach Blake Shelton, "the screwball dance-club oddity", "Billy the Kid" and various acoustic moments like the bittersweet "Daniel." Chuck Campbell of Honolulu Pulse claims "Although Frampton is consistently presented as an adorable sort, it sounds genuine enough that when she sings on closer "Trapeze," 'If I could tell you one thing, I’d tell you I’m not leaving,' you hope she means it". He comments that "It’s rare for singing-competition shows like "American Idol" to turn contestants into actual idols." however they noted "Dia Frampton’s Red gets it right".

Commercial performance 
The album debuted at number one on the Billboard Top Heatseekers. It debuted at number 106 on the Billboard Top 200 Albums chart, selling a little over 10,000 copies in its first week. The album has also gone Gold in Thailand.

Track listing

Personnel
Credits for Red adapted from Allmusic.

Nate Albert – A&R
Neal Avron – mixing
Chris Baldwin – cover photo, photography
Sandy Brummels	– art direction
busbee –  engineer, producer, vocal engineer, musician
J Bonilla – producer
Curt Schneider – bass
Jerry McPherson – guitar
Jonathan Berry – guitar
Jon Smith – drums
Steve Lu – string arrangements
Martin Dodd – A&R
Mark Foster – additional production, bass, keyboards, background vocals
Dia Frampton –  vocals
Meg Frampton – musician, background vocals
Toby Gad –  engineer, mixing, producer
Carlo Gimenez – musician
Adam Halferty- background vocals
David Ryan Harris – engineer, guitar, producer
David Hodges –  engineer, guitar, keyboards, producer
Sean Hurley – bass
Isom Innis – bass, drums, engineer, guitar, keyboards, percussion, producer, programming
Ted Jensen-mastering
Mike Kaminsky – management
Ian Kirkpatrick – producer
Greg Kurstin – engineer, producer
Ian MacGregor – engineer
Tom MacKay – A&R
Manny Marroquin – mixing
Nicholas Price – musician
Zac Rae – keyboards
Lynn M Scott –	marketing
Chris Seefried –  background vocals
Jesse Shatkin – engineer
Daniel Silbert – inside photo, photography
Olivia Smith –	art direction, package design
Jonathan Snyder – musician
Aaron Sterling	– drums
Isabella Summers –  engineer, producer
Greg Wells – bass, drums, guitar, mixing, piano, producer, programming

Chart positions

Certifications

References 

2011 debut albums
Albums produced by busbee
Universal Republic Records albums
Albums produced by Greg Kurstin
Albums produced by Greg Wells
Albums produced by Toby Gad